In optimal transport, a branch of mathematics, polar factorization of vector fields is a basic result due to Brenier (1987), with antecedents of Knott-Smith (1984) and Rachev (1985), that generalizes many existing results among which are the polar decomposition of real matrices, and the rearrangement of real-valued functions.

The theorem
 Notation. Denote  the image measure of  through the map .

 Definition: Measure preserving map. Let  and  be some probability spaces and  a map.

 Theorem. Assume that  is absolutely continuous. Then there is a convex function  and a map  preserving  such that

Applications and connections

Dimension 1
In dimension 1, and when  is the Lebesgue measure over the unit interval, the result specializes to Ryff's theorem.

Polar decomposition of matrices
Assuming  where  is an invertible  matrix and considering  the  probability measure, the polar decomposition boils down to

where  is a symmetric positive definite matrix, and  an orthogonal matrix.

Helmholtz decomposition
The results also allow to recover Helmholtz decomposition. Letting  be a smooth vector field it can then be written in a unique way as

The connection can be seen by assuming  is the Lebesgue measure on a compact set  and by writing  as a perturbation of the identity map

where  is small. Then, for any test function  the following holds:

where the fact that  was preserving the Lebesgue measure was used in the second equality.

As a result,  for any smooth function , which implies that  is divergence-free.

References 

Theorems